Valentin Lavillenie ( or ; born 16 July 1991) is a French athlete specialising in the pole vault. He won the gold medal at the 2013 Jeux de la Francophonie. Lavillenie is the younger brother of another pole vaulter, a former world record holder, Renaud Lavillenie.

Competition record

Notes

References

1991 births
Living people
French male pole vaulters
Sportspeople from Charente
Athletes (track and field) at the 2013 Mediterranean Games
Mediterranean Games competitors for France
Athletes (track and field) at the 2020 Summer Olympics
Olympic athletes of France